Callionymus bleekeri, Bleeker's deepwater dragonet, is a species of dragonet endemic to the Pacific Ocean waters around Indonesia. The specific name honours the Dutch ichthyologist and surgeon Pieter Bleeker (1819-1878).

References 

B
Fish described in 1983
Taxa named by Ronald Fricke